Bake with Anna Olson was a cooking show which focuses on baking, hosted by Canadian born in USA pastry chef Anna Olson and was originally broadcast by Food Network Canada.  It can be seen in Canada on Cooking Channel in syndication.

Synopsis
Each episode acts as a lesson for a specific baking technique, and is divided into four parts. Olson first focuses on the foundation, teaching viewers a simple key recipe using the baking skill at a beginner's level.  Next, a more complex recipe is shown building on the foundation skill.  Then, a showcase recipe is demonstrated featuring an elaborate, restaurant-quality dessert or savoury baked good.  Finally, the episode concludes by creating a new mini-recipe using elements of the first three recipes.  This includes the instructions on making puff pastry, pies and chocolate cake with classic recipes for chocolate mousse cake, pecan pie, as well as new items such as savoury hor d'oeuvres. Also included are basic baking instructions such as using a whisk to fold egg whites or double-checking measuring spoons and cups for accuracy, to ensure each baking step is done properly.

Series overview

International syndication

See also
Sugar

References

2012 Canadian television series debuts
2015 Canadian television series endings
Food Network (Canadian TV channel) original programming
Television series by Corus Entertainment
English-language television shows
2010s Canadian cooking television series